Varicode is a self-synchronizing code for use in PSK31. It supports all ASCII characters, but the characters used most frequently in English have shorter codes. The space between characters is indicated by a 00 sequence, an implementation of Fibonacci coding.  Originally created for speeding up real-time keyboard-to-keyboard exchanges over low bandwidth links, Varicode is freely available.

Limitations
 Varicode provides somewhat weaker compression in languages other than English that use same characters as in English.

Varicode table

Control characters

Printable characters

Character lengths
Beginning with the single-bit code "1", valid varicode values may be formed by prepending a "1" or "10" to a shorter code.  Thus, the number of codes of length n is equal to the Fibonacci number Fn.  Varicode uses the 88 values of lengths up to 9 bits, and 40 of the 55 codes of length 10.

As transmitted, the codes are two bits longer due to the trailing delimiter 00.

References

Character encoding